The 1972 U.S. Pro Tennis Championships was a men's tennis tournament played on outdoor hard courts at the Longwood Cricket Club in Chestnut Hill, Massachusetts in the United States and was part of the 1972 World Championship Tennis circuit. It was the 45th edition of the tournament and was held from July 31 through August 6, 1972. Bob Lutz defeated John Newcombe, Rod Laver and Cliff Drysdale prior to beating Tom Okker in the Finals.

Finals

Singles

 Bob Lutz defeated  Tom Okker, 6–4, 2–6, 6–4, 6–4

Doubles

 John Newcombe /  Tony Roche defeated  Arthur Ashe /  Bob Lutz, 6–3, 1–6, 7–6

References

External links
 Longwood Cricket Club – list of U.S. Pro Champions

1972
1972 in American tennis
1972 in sports in Massachusetts
July 1972 sports events in the United States
August 1972 sports events in the United States
Chestnut Hill, Massachusetts
Hard court tennis tournaments in the United States
History of Middlesex County, Massachusetts
Sports in Middlesex County, Massachusetts
Tennis tournaments in Massachusetts
Tourist attractions in Middlesex County, Massachusetts